The Girl Before is a 4-part television thriller adaptation created by J.P. Delaney for BBC One and HBO Max, based on the 2016 novel of the same name by Delaney.

Premise
A traumatised woman falls in love with an extraordinary minimalist house, which remains under the spell of the architect who originally designed it, but not everything may be as it seems.

Cast
 Gugu Mbatha-Raw as Jane Cavendish, a single woman who moves into the minimalist house Edward built, three years after Emma and Simon.
 David Oyelowo as Edward, the architect of the minimalist house with many rules.
 Jessica Plummer as Emma Matthews, partner of Simon. They move into the minimalist house that Edward designed three years prior to Jane and is revealed to have died in the minimalist house
 Ben Hardy as Simon, partner of Emma, who reluctantly moves into the minimalist house designed by Edward.

Recurring
 Ian Conningham as DI James Clarke
 Amanda Drew as Carol
 Mark Stanley as Saul
 Rakhee Thakrar as Mia
 Ben Addis as Peter Creed
 Natasha Atherton as Leona

Episodes

Production
Ron Howard was initially linked to the project. Killing Eve director Lisa Brühlmann directed. J.P. Delaney created, wrote and executive-produced the series. He also co-wrote two episodes with screenwriter Marissa Lestrade. Filming began in Bristol in the spring of 2021 on location in Redland, Bristol and at The Bottle Yard Studios. ITV Studios is the international distributor for the series.

Broadcast
The Girl Before is broadcast on BBC One in the UK and streaming on the BBC iPlayer and streaming in the United States of America on HBO Max. The Girl Before premieres in Australia from Thursday 10 February 2022 on Foxtel and Binge.

Reception
On review aggregator website Rotten Tomatoes, the series holds a 50% approval rating based on 14 reviews, with an average rating of 5.6/10. The website's critics consensus reads, "Despite stellar performances from Gugu Mbatha-Raw and Jessica Plummer, The Girl Before fizzles as a mystery." On Metacritic, the series has a score of 56 out of 100, based on 14 reviews, indicating "mixed or average reviews".

Leila Latif of The A.V. Club gave the limited series a B and said, "...the series still proves more artful than most entries in the genre. [However], many of its larger plot points and mysteries are predictably resolved (made more predictable still by a small cast that provides a limited number of solutions), but the series shines best when it takes a step back from the twists and turns and settles into character study."

References

External links
 

2021 British television series debuts
2021 British television series endings
2020s British drama television series
2020s British television miniseries
BBC television dramas
BBC high definition shows
Television series by ITV Studios
English-language television shows
Television shows shot in Bristol
British thriller television series